Kansas's 26th Senate district is one of 40 districts in the Kansas Senate. It has been represented by Republican Dan Kerschen since 2013, following his primary defeat of fellow Republican Dick Kelsey.

Geography
District 26 covers the southern and southwestern suburbs of Wichita in Sedgwick County, including some of Wichita proper as well as Haysville, Mulvane, Cheney, Garden Plain, and parts of Derby, Clearwater, and Goddard.

The district is located entirely within Kansas's 4th congressional district, and overlaps with the 81st, 82nd, 93rd, 94th, 97th, 98th, and 101st districts of the Kansas House of Representatives.

Recent election results

2020

2016

2012

Federal and statewide results in District 26

References

26
Sedgwick County, Kansas